Edward Allan Wagner Tizón (born February 7, 1942) is a Peruvian diplomat who most recently served as the Minister of Foreign Affairs from February 2021 to July 2021. He previously served twice in the position from 2002 to 2003 and from 1985 to 1988. In addition, he served as Minister of Defense from 2006 to 2007.

Recently, he was selected by the Peruvian Government, in order to act as its agent before the International Court of Justice, in the case concerning maritime delimitation with Chile.

Biography 
His parents were Carlos Adolfo Wagner Vizcarra and María Antonieta Tizón Ponce.

Allan Wagner completed his primary studies at the Colegio Maristas de San Isidro and high school at the Great Ignacio Merino de Talara School Unit.

He studied chemical engineering at the National University of Engineering, as well as at the National University of Trujillo from 1959–1962. He studied at the Faculty of Humanities at the Pontifical Catholic University of Peru from 1963 to 1964.

Diplomatic career 
Allan Wagner entered the Ministry of Foreign Affairs of Peru by public tender on May 2, 1963 with the grade of Assistant 5th, becoming the person in charge of the General Agreement on Customs Tariffs and Trade, traveling to Switzerland to train in international trade negotiations. He also participated in various meetings that led to the signing of the Cartagena Agreement and the creation of the Andean Group, today the Andean Community of Nations.

See also 
 Andean Community

External links 

1942 births
Living people
People from Lima
Peruvian people of German descent
Foreign ministers of Peru
Defense ministers of Peru
Andean Community people